Mahagama Assembly constituency   is an assembly constituency in the Indian state of Jharkhand.

Overview
Mahagama (Vidhan Sabha constituency) covers: Mahagama and Meherma Police Stations in Godda district.

Mahagama Assembly constituency is part of Godda (Lok Sabha constituency).

Members of Legislative Assembly
2019 – Deepika Pandey Singh, Indian National Congress
2014 - Ashok Kumar, Bharatiya Janata Party
2009 – Rajesh Ranjan, Indian National Congress
2005 -  Ashok Kumar, Bharatiya Janata Party
2000 -  Ashok Kumar, Bharatiya Janata Party

Election Results

2019

2014

See also
 Meharama
 Mahagama (community development block)
 Mahagama

References

Assembly constituencies of Jharkhand
Godda district